Cono Township is one of sixteen townships in Buchanan County, Iowa, United States.  As of the 2000 census, its population was 420.

Geography 

References

External links 
 City-Data.com

Townships in Buchanan County, Iowa
Townships in Iowa